This is a list of model railways.

The world's first model railway was made for the son of Emperor Napoleon III in 1859 at the Château de Saint-Cloud. However, "There is a strong possibility that Matthew Murray, who built the geared-for-safety rack engines for John Blenkinsop's coal mine near Leeds, England, was actually the first man ever to make a model locomotive."

List

 Carolwood Pacific Railroad - USA
 Choo Choo Barn - USA
 Gorre & Daphetid (HO) - USA
 The Great Train Story (HO) - USA
 Miniatur Wunderland — the world's largest model railway and airport (HO) - Hamburg, Germany
 Miniature Railroad & Village - USA
 Modelbane Europa (HO) - Hadsten, Denmark
 National Railway Museum - a railway museum including a model railway (O) - York, United Kingdom.
 Northlandz (HO) - USA
 Pendon Museum (EM '4mm') - Long Wittenham near Oxford, United Kingdom
 Roadside America (O) - USA
 Sonoma TrainTown Railroad  1:4 scale - USA
 Virginian and Ohio 
 Grand Maket Rossiya (HO) - St. Petersburg, Russia
 MinNature (HO) - Subang Jaya, Malaysia
 Stanley Miniventure (HO) - Bangkok, Thailand
 EnterTRAINment Junction (G) - USA
 Smilestones (HO) - 250 m2 model with 1.3 kilometer of tracks at the Rhine Falls, Switzerland.
 Chemins de fer du Käsenberg (HO) -  610 m2 model with 2.045 kilometres of tracks in Granges Paccot, Switzerland.
 Swiss-Miniatur (1:25) - 14,000 m2 park with Swiss Landmarks and 3.5 kilometres of track in Melide, Switzerland
 Swiss Museum of Transport (HO) – Replica of the Gotthard railway line.
Sydney Live Steam Locomotive Society West Ryde, NSW
The Model Railroad Club of Toronto Toronto, ON
Arizona Model Railroading Society, Phoenix, AZ
 Golden State Model Railroad Museum, Point Richmond, Richmond, California
 Highland Park Society of Model Railroad Engineers, also known as the Highland Pacific Club of San Gabriel, CA
 San Diego Model Railroad Museum, San Diego, CA
 Tech Model Railroad Club, HO scale, student organization at Massachusetts Institute of Technology (MIT)
 Cherry Valley 2-rail O scale, Merchantville NJ.
 New York Society of Model Engineers, Carlstadt NJ. Incorporated 1926.

UK and Ireland 
A theme through many of these has been a movement away from the 'mass of moving trains' approach to a more pictorial approach, producing scenes and dioramas that represented the appearance of their original prototype.

Many of these standard gauge railways avoided the compromise of 00 gauge in favour of finescale standards such as EM and P4. Others modelled the narrow gauge. In both cases, a lack of ready to run rolling stock was not a drawback to an approach already based largely on scratchbuilding anyway, for quality reasons.

Germany

India

Switzerland

United States

Canada

See also
 List of rail transport modellers

References

Rail transport modelling
 List of model railways